Franz Kraemer,  (June 1, 1914 – August 27, 1999) was a Canadian radio producer, a "pioneer produced of opera at CBC Television". In the 1930 he studied music in Vienna, with Alban Berg, Anton von Webern and others. Leaving Austria like many other artists in the 1930s around the time of the Nazi takeover in 1938, Kraemer became a naturalized Canadian citizen in 1947, the first year that Canadian citizenship was made available (prior to that all Canadians were considered British subjects). Kraemer has made a name of himself as a gifted music composer and producer; he has been called by Adrienne Clarkson, former Governor General of Canada and CBC journalist, as "the most prolific and talented music producer the CBC Television ever produced ... He was a mentor for many of us in television who did that kind of programming."

Kraemer's career was cut short in Austria by fascism and a climate of hatred. Asked about it, we would simply say "Mr. Hitler ruined me." In Canada, he became a close colleague and friend of Glenn Gould. Eric Koch said "Franz knew everything" in music.
In 1971, he was appointed music director of the Toronto Arts Foundation 
In 1981, he was made a Member of the Order of Canada and was promoted to Officer in 1987.

References

External links
 Franz Kraemer at The Canadian Encyclopedia
 Krämer and Glenn Gould, RIP Franz Kraemer
 Krämer and Glenn Gould, in conversation discussing modern and classical music. Two films. (Wrong writing: "Kramer")

1914 births
1999 deaths
Canadian radio producers
Officers of the Order of Canada
Austrian emigrants to Canada